Mark Bennett may refer to:

 Mark Bennett (rugby union, born 1969), Welsh rugby union footballer
 Mark Bennett (rugby union, born 1993), Scottish rugby union footballer
 Mark Bennett (snooker player) (born 1963), former professional snooker player
 Mark J. Bennett (born 1953), former Hawaii Attorney General, judge of the United States Court of Appeals for the Ninth Circuit (2018–)
 Mark W. Bennett (born 1950), judge of the United States District Court for the Northern District of Iowa